Johannes Kühn (born 19 November 1991) is a German biathlete. He competed in the 2018 Winter Olympics.

Biathlon results
All results are sourced from the International Biathlon Union.

Olympic Games
0 medal

World Championships

*During Olympic seasons competitions are only held for those events not included in the Olympic program.
**The single mixed relay was added as an event in 2019.

References

External links

1991 births
Living people
Biathletes at the 2018 Winter Olympics
Biathletes at the 2022 Winter Olympics
German male biathletes
Olympic biathletes of Germany
People from Passau
Sportspeople from Lower Bavaria
21st-century German people